Gripe Sports Center is a sports complex located in the Gripe city district of Split, Croatia. It features four indoor halls, and is used to host many sports, as well as concerts. The seating capacity of the small indoor hall is 3,500, and of the biggest one is 6,000.

History
The sports complex was built in the late 1970s, for the 1979 Mediterranean Games. The sports complex has been used as the home venues of the KK Split basketball team, and the MNK Split Tommy futsal team.

Structure and features
Two night clubs are incorporated into the center, as well as numerous shops, coffeehouses, and restaurants.

See also
 List of indoor arenas in Croatia
 List of indoor arenas in Europe

References

External links
 ŠC Gripe – Javna ustanova športski objekti Split

Sports venues in Split, Croatia
Indoor arenas in Croatia
Basketball venues in Croatia
KK Split
Sports complexes